The palatine uvula is a fleshy lobe hanging from the back of the mouth.

The uvula may also refer to:
Uvula of cerebellum
Uvula of urinary bladder